Autoroute 13, or L'Autoroute de Normandie links Paris to Caen, Calvados.

The motorway starts in Paris at the Porte d'Auteuil, a former gate of the Paris walls, and ends at Mondeville's Mondeville 2 (Porte de Paris) exchange junction on the Boulevard Périphérique (Caen). The A13 is France's oldest motorway (opening in 1946) and is intensively used between Paris and Normandy for both commuting and holiday makers.
The A13 is operated by the Société des Autoroutes de Paris Normandie from Buchelay toll onwards, whilst the Parisian stretch of motorway is operated by the Île-de-France Council. The A13 is toll-free within the Île-de-France region and between junctions 21 and 24 to the south of Rouen.

History
The France carried out its first studies in 1927 to create the l'Autoroute de l'Ouest that was to connect the capital to Normandy. In addition, Le Havre and Cherbourg were important stopovers for luxury liners at a time when there were few commercial aircraft. Delayed by the historic nature of Parc de Saint-Cloud, the project was declared a public utility on 5 May 1935. The initial highway was planned with a start at the Pont de Saint-Cloud and heading west to Rocquencourt where it would connect to the old N190 route to Orgeval and old N10 route to Trappes. This new route was accompanied by the reconstruction of the Pont de Saint-Cloud and was completed in April 1940. The other major project was the 800m Saint-Cloud tunnel that was to open at the end of 1940 but German occupation of France ended its completion and it was used as storage for weapons. The route, from Saint-Cloud-Ouest to Vaucresson in the direction of Orgeval, was opened to the public on 4 October 1941. The tunnel works resumed from October 1945, with the tunnel surfaced and tiled.
 
The complex was opened to traffic on 9 June 1946 on the occasion of the first post-war motor race. The highway was completely free, financed entirely from state funds. At the Triangle de Rocquencourt, the exit to Trappes was via a ramp on the left, which was a curiosity, as traffic was on the right. This highway was credited until the 1960s with one star in the Michelin green guide Environs de Paris, because of its absolute modernity and novelty.

The French motorways were then named in relation to the national roads they run along, hence the A13 due to the proximity of the N13.

The decree of 12 June 1967 declared the construction of the motorway between Rouen (Les Essarts) and Caen to be a public utility.

Until 1974, the A13 stopped at the Pont de Saint-Cloud. Since then, it has been connected to the Paris ring road by the Saint-Cloud viaduct overlooking the Seine and by a tunnel under the northern Boulogne-Billancourt, cutting through the garden of Château Rothschild.

As part of the connection of the A86 motorway, the first section of which between Rueil-Malmaison and Vaucresson which was put into service in June 2009 (Duplex A86 tunnel), it was decided to add a fourth lane in both directions and to install acoustic screens between the A13/A86 interchange and the Triangle de Rocquencourt. The interchanges between the A13 and A12 on one side and the A13 and RN 186 on the other, were redeveloped to improve traffic flow. The fourth lane in the westbound direction from Paris provides easy access to the Triangle de Rocquencourt. It was inaugurated in January 2011. The fourth lane in an eastbound direction to Paris was inaugurated in July 2011. The six-month delay was explained by the need to build "a mobile guardrail on this fourth lane" which is a lane assigned to the Duplex A86 tunnel.

On 3 September 2019, after three years of construction (2016-2019), a third overpass at the Guerville viaduct was commissioned in the eastbound direction to Paris, renovated the two existing overpasses (direction westbound) dating from the 1960s, without cutting off traffic.

List of junctions
{| class="plainrowheaders wikitable"
|-
!scope=col|Department
!scope=col|Location
!scope=col|km
!scope=col|mi
!scope=col|Junction
!scope=col|Destinations
!scope=col|Notes
|-
|rowspan="6"|Calvados
|rowspan="1"|Caen
|0.0
|0.0
| - 1. Porte de Paris
|Deauville-Trouville / Le Havre / Rouen / Paris
|
|-
|rowspan="1"|Manneville
|3.7
|2.3
|
|Frenouville / Bellengreville / Mezidon-Canon
|
|-
|rowspan="1"|Troarn
|7.4
|4.6
| - Junction 31
|Sannerville / Troarn
|
|-
|rowspan="1"|Cricqueville-en-Auge
|18.1
|11.2
| - Junction 30
|Dozule / Dives sur Mer / Cabourg / Houlgate
|
|-
|rowspan="1"|Drubec
|33.2
|20.6
| - Junction 29A
|Drubec / Villers sur Mer / St. Pierre sur Dives
|Eastbound entry only / Westbound exit only
|-
|rowspan="1"|Pont-l'Évêque
|40.9
|25.4
| - Pont-l'Évêque
|Deauville-Trouville / Pont-l'Évêque / Lisieux
|
|-
|rowspan="8"|Eure
|rowspan="2"|Beuzeville
|49.9
|31.0
|
|Pont de Normandie / Honfleur / Le Havre / Amiens / Calais
|
|-
|54.3
|33.7
| - Junction 28
|Beuzeville / Pont Audemer
|
|-
|rowspan="1"|Toutainville
|64.4
|40.0
|
|Toutainville
|Eastbound entry only / Westbound exit only
|-
|rowspan="2"|Bourneville-Sainte-Croix
|76.3
|47.4
| - Junction 28 Elbeuf
|
|Eastbound entry / Westbound exit
|-
|77.5
|48.1
| - Junction 26
|Brionne / Pont-Audemer - Est
|
|-
|rowspan="1"|Bourg-Achard
|90.5
|56.2
| - Junction 25
|Bourg-Achard / Yvetot
|
|-
|rowspan="1"|Honguemare-Guenouville
|91.4
|56.8
|
|Alencon / Le Mans / Bordeaux
|
|-
|rowspan="1"|Saint-Ouen-de-Thouberville
|99.2
|61.6
| - Junction 24 Bourgtheroulde
|Bourgtheroulde / Caen / Alencon
|
|-
|rowspan="4"|Seine-Maritime
|rowspan="1"|Grand-Couronne
|103.0
|64.0
| - Junction 23
|Rouen-Ouest / Grand-Couronne / Elbeuf / Rouen-Centre
|Eastbound exit only / Westbound entry only
|-
|rowspan="2"|Oissel
|109.0
|67.7
|
|Rouen (westbound)
|Eastbound entry only / Westbound exit only
|-
|110.0
|68.3
|- Junction 22 Oissel
|Rouen-est / Amiens-Riems / Calais
|
|-
|rowspan="1"|Tourville-la-Rivière
|112.0
|69.6
| - Junction 21 Ctre Commercial Region
|Cleon / Elbeuf-centre
|
|-
|rowspan="5"|Eure
|rowspan="1"|Criquebeuf-sur-Seine
|115.0
|71.4
| - Junction 20
|Pont de l'Arche / Elbeuf-est / Vernon
|
|-
|rowspan="1"|Val-de-Reuil
|123.0
|76.4
| - Junction 19
|Louviers / Val de Reuil / Orleans / Evreux
|
|-
|rowspan="1"|Heudebouville
|131.0
|81.4
| - Junction 18
|Louviers
|Eastbound entry only / Westbound exit only
|-
|rowspan="1"|Saint-Aubin-sur-Gaillon
|139.0
|86.3
| - Junction 17
|Les Andelys / Gaillon
|
|-
|rowspan="1"|La Heunière
|151.0
|93.8
| - Junction 16
|Pacy sur Eure / Vernon
|
|-
|rowspan="12"|Yvelines
|rowspan="1"|La Villeneuve-en-Chevrie
|158.0
|98.1
| - Junction 15
|Bonnieres
|
|-
|rowspan="1"|Rosny-sur-Seine
|166.0
|103.1
| - Junction 14
|Bonnieres
|
|-
|rowspan="1"|Buchelay
|173.0
|107.5
| - Junction 13 Mantes-Quest
|Vernon / Evreux
|Eastbound entry only / Westbound exit only
|-
|rowspan="2"|Mantes-la-Ville
|174.0
|108.1
| - Junction 12 Mantes-Sud
|Mantes-la-Ville / Limay / Guerville
|
|-
|176.0
|109.3
| - Junction 11 Mantes-Est
|Mantes la Ville / Limay / Guerville
|
|-
|rowspan="1"|Épône
|183.0
|113.7
| - Junction 10
|Rambouillet
|
|-
|rowspan="1"|Flins-sur-Seine
|187.0
|116.1
| - Junction 9
|Aubergenville / Flins
|
|-
|rowspan="1"|Bouafle
|190.0
|118.0
| - Junction 8
|Ecquevilly / Bouafle / Les Mureau-Meulan
|Eastbound exit only / Westbound entry only
|-
|rowspan="1"|Chapet
|192.0
|119.3
| - Junction 8
|Ecquevilly / Les Mureau-Meulan
|Eastbound entry only / Westbound exit only
|-
|rowspan="1"|Orgeval
|198.0
|123.0
| - Junction 7
|La Defense / Nanterre / St Germain en Laye / Poissy
|
|-
|rowspan="2"|Bailly / Le Chesnay-Rocquencourt
|211.0
|131.0
| - Junction 6
|Trappes
|
|-
|212.0
|131.7
| - Junction 6
|Versailles
|
|-
|rowspan="5"|Hauts-de-Seine
|rowspan="2"|Vaucresson
|215.0
|133.5
| - Junction 5
|Nanterre / Creteil
|
|-
|216.0
|134.2
| - Junction 5
|Montreuil / Versailles
|
|-
|rowspan="2"|Saint-Cloud
|220.0
|136.6
| - Junction 4
|Saint-Cloud / Ville-d'Avray
|Eastbound exit only
|-
|221.0
|137.3
| - Junction 3 Sevres
|Saint-Cloud / Pont de Saint-Cloud
|
|-
|rowspan="1"|Boulogne-Billancourt
|222.0
|137.9
| - Junction 2
|Boulogne-Billancourt
|Eastbound exit only
|-
|rowspan="2"|Paris
|rowspan="2"|Paris 16
|223.0
|138.5
|Av. de la Prte d'Auteuil - Junction 1
|Boulogne-Billancourt
|Eastbound exit only
|-
|224.0
|139.1
|Boulevard Périphérique
|Lille / Metz-Nancy / Lyon
|-

References

External links

 SAPN motorways live traffic
 A13 autoroute in Saratlas

A13